Sagara (Tanzanian ward) is an administrative ward in the Kongwa district of the Dodoma Region of Tanzania. According to the 2012 census, the ward has a total population of 23,000.

References

Wards of Dodoma Region